Whitehall is a city in the U.S state of Ohio, located 6.6 miles (10.6 km) east of the state capital of Columbus in Franklin County.  Whitehall had a population of 20,127 in the 2020 census. Founded in 1947, Whitehall is a growing suburb of Columbus.  Per the U.S. Census Bureau, Whitehall's population is culturally and racially diverse, with over 50% of the population identifying as black, African American, Hispanic or Latino, with over 20% speaking a language other than English at home.

The median home value is $84,800 and the median household income is $41,022. Whitehall is home to the headquarters of major companies such as Heartland Bank, The Wasserstrom Company and Priority Designs. The current mayor of Whitehall is Kim Maggard.  Maggard was re-elected for a third term in 2019.

History
In the 1940s and 1950s, Whitehall still had working farms, and it was a mixed income area with mainly small houses. It was still a village in the 1940s, and residents filed for incorporation in 1947. In 1952 the borders expanded east to the country club and Big Walnut Creek. Rapid growth meant that it became a city during the 1950s. The first shopping center strip in the country was built and opened in Whitehall in 1948, called Casto's Town and Country. The National Road passed through Whitehall.

In August 1970, two department stores in Whitehall were bombed as part of a robbery scheme. William Harris was arrested after fleeing the scene. He was pursued and captured by motorcyclist Roger Penwell. Penwell pursued despite gunfire. He received the Carnegie Hero Fund's Bronze Medal and was amply rewarded for heroism. Penwell's actions enabled police to locate more of Harris's bombs, saving property and many lives. Harris was a 1st lieutenant in the United States Air Force.

Geography

Whitehall is located at  (39.963664, -82.882374).

Big Walnut Creek flows through Whitehall.

Like the nearby city of Bexley and villages of Minerva Park and Valleyview, Whitehall is an enclave of Columbus.

Whitehall is a suburban community of Columbus, Ohio in Franklin County. It is in close proximity to John Glenn Columbus International Airport. The 338th Army Band is stationed there at the Defense Supply Center, Columbus.

The city has three elementary schools (Etna Road, Kae Avenue, and Beechwood), one junior high school (Rosemore), and one high school (Whitehall-Yearling High School). Big Walnut Creek along with the Columbus Country Club (part of the City of Columbus) define the eastern border of Whitehall.

Demographics

2010 census
As of the census of 2010, there were 18,062 people, 7,522 households, and 4,406 families living in the city. The racial makeup of the city was 58.8% White, 29.3% African American, 0.5% Native American, 1.5% Asian, 5.5% from other races, and 4.4% from two or more races. Hispanic or Latino of any race were 9.9% of the population.

There were 7,522 households, of which 32.6% had children under the age of 18 living with them, 31.8% were married couples living together, 19.3% had a female householder with no husband or wife present, 7.5% had a male householder with no wife or husband present, and 41.4% were non-families. Non-binary individuals were not counted. 34.0% of all households were made up of individuals, and 9.4% had someone living alone who was 65 years of age or older. The average household size was 2.40 and the average family size was 3.07.

The median age in the city was 35 years. 25.8% of residents were under the age of 18; 9.2% were between the ages of 18 and 24; 28.4% were from 25 to 44; 25.5% were from 45 to 64; and 11.2% were 65 years of age or older. The gender makeup of the city was 48.6% male and 51.4% female.

2000 census
As of the census of 2000, there were 19,201 people, 8,343 households, and 4,930 families living in the city. The population density was 3,681.9 people per square mile (1,420.2/km). There were 8,997 housing units at an average density of 1,725.2 per square mile (665.5/km). The racial makeup of the city was 74.40% White, 19.16% African American, 0.39% Native American, 2.04% Asian, 0.03% Pacific Islander, 1.21% from other races, and 2.78% from two or more races. Hispanic or Latino of any race were 2.95% of the population.

There were 8,343 households, out of which 29.1% had children under the age of 18 living with them, 37.3% were married couples living together, 16.3% had a female householder with no husband present, and 40.9% were non-families. 35.0% of all households were made up of individuals, and 9.3% had someone living alone who was 65 years of age or older. The average household size was 2.30 and the average family size was 2.96.

In the city the population was spread out, with 25.3% under the age of 18, 9.4% from 18 to 24, 32.2% from 25 to 44, 21.0% from 45 to 64, and 12.0% who were 65 years of age or older. The median age was 35 years. For every 100 females, there were 93.9 males. For every 100 females age 18 and over, there were 89.7 males.

The median income for a household in the city was $32,794, and the median income for a family was $37,296. Males had a median income of $30,896 versus $25,007 for females. The per capita income for the city was $16,867. About 11.1% of families and 14.9% of the population were below the poverty line, including 20.3% of those under age 18 and 12.4% of those age 65 or over.

Economy
In recent years, Whitehall has experienced a significant amount of development and redevelopment within the community. Over 2,300+ jobs were created or committed between 2012-2019. More than $228 million of taxable income, payroll and business profit have been added since 2012, and $65 million in private/public investment per square mile has been completed, is in progress or has been committed since 2010  In 2019, 41 new businesses opened in the City of Whitehall as well as Whitehall Community Park YMCA, a $6.5 million project and one of the largest single investments into recreational amenities in Whitehall’s history.

In 2018, Heartland Bank opened a new 60,000-square-foot headquarters in Whitehall at 430 N. Hamilton Road adjacent to the Whitehall Community Park. The new building is home to 107 of Heartland Bank’s Central Ohio associates and was built for expansion to accommodate over 230 associates. It features multiple amenities including a branch office and training facility, fitness center, multiple collaboration spaces, state-of-the-art technology, ideation center, direct access to walking trails in the park and a patio area for outdoor meetings and events.

In early 2017, The Wasserstrom Company had plans to relocate to Whitehall. And by October 2018 was finishing up their renovation and started preparing for employees to relocate to the new building located at 4500 E. Broad Street in Whitehall. The 50,000 square-foot headquarters houses 225 Wasserstrom employees. The square footage consists of open office space, to encourage interaction across all departments as well as a number of common areas for collaboration or independent work time. A unique feature of the space is the museum highlighting the company’s many years in business. Employees can see all the historic products and memorabilia.

Notably, mid-century era apartments on the southwest corner of South Hamilton Road and Fairway Boulevard were purchased in 2016 by the City of Whitehall, and subsequently sold to a private developer to be turned into a $50 million new mixed-use development on Broad Street called Norton Crossing. Within that development will be The Lofts at Norton Crossing, 360 brand new luxury apartments near downtown Columbus, an Old Bag of Nails restaurant, office and retail space. The first residents moved into the development in July 2020. The plans for Norton Crossing include concepts for what will be Whitehall’s 1.5 acre, sixth community park with a pavilion for programming such as outdoor concerts, movies, farmers markets and more.

In 2019, the City of Whitehall acquired a 35-acre property at the intersection of Broad and Hamilton formerly known as Woodcliff Commons. That land acquisition, coupled with the adjacent site that was formerly the golf dome, represents 50-acres of opportunity for the community. The future redevelopment is next door to the beautiful 80-acre Whitehall Community Park.  The property will be developed into new commercial and office space, retail, restaurants and entertainment, integrated mobility, access and connectivity to greenspace, trails and Whitehall Community Park and hundreds of new residential units.

Notable people
Monica Day, television personality, 2007 Miss Ohio USA
Domenik Hixon, NFL wide receiver
Keiwan Ratliff, NFL cornerback
Jason Thomas, September 11 attacks rescuer
Tina Maharath, Ohio State Senator
Martin Nessley, LA Clippers, center

References

External links
City website

Cities in Franklin County, Ohio
Enclaves in the United States
Cities in Ohio